Kakothrips pisivorus, or the pea thrip, is a species of thrip native to Europe which lives in the flowers of peas and other legumes causing damage to the pods inside as they are developing.

Identification
The pea thrip is a brown insect 2 mm in length with two pairs of feathery wings and yellowy legs. It feeds on the fruit of many legumes, including the pea plant, from which it takes its name. These thrips are generally identified by the damage done to pea pods as their larvae eat them.

References

Thripidae
Insects described in 1880
Insects of Europe